The Battle of Britain Memorial Flight (BBMF) is a Royal Air Force flight which provides an aerial display group usually comprising an Avro Lancaster, a Supermarine Spitfire and a Hawker Hurricane. The aircraft are regularly seen at events commemorating the Second World War and upon British State occasions, notably Trooping the Colour, celebrating Queen Elizabeth II's 80th birthday in 2006, as well as the wedding of Prince William and Catherine Middleton in 2011 and at air displays throughout the United Kingdom and Europe.

The flight is administratively part of No. 1 Group RAF, operating out of RAF Coningsby in Lincolnshire.

Aircraft

Although usually seen flying in a formation of three, the Lancaster flanked by a fighter on each wing, the BBMF comprises a total of 12 aircraft:
 1 Avro Lancaster
 6 Supermarine Spitfires
 2 Hawker Hurricanes
 1 Douglas Dakota
 2 de Havilland Canada DHC-1 Chipmunks

Spitfires
Individual aircraft have historic heritages; the oldest of the Spitfires, P7350 (G-AWIJ), is a Mk.IIa, which originally flew in the Battle of Britain in 1940, with 266 and 603 Squadrons. In 2019 she was repainted in the No. 54 Squadron code 'KL-B', which represents the aircraft flown by Al Deere from 10 July 1940 until 31 August 1940.

The Mk Vb Spitfire, AB910, escorted convoys in the Battle of the Atlantic. She then flew escort patrols during bombing raids on the German battleships Scharnhorst and Gneisenau, then (as part of No. 133 squadron), she fought in the Dieppe Raid. Capping this long career, as part of No. 402 Squadron RCAF, she flew cover patrols over the Normandy beaches on D-Day and in the subsequent weeks – as did another of the flight's Spitfires, with No. 443 Squadron RCAF. As of August 2018, AB910 was adorned with the D-Day colour scheme of Flight Lieutenant Tony Cooper's 64 Squadron Mk Vb 'SH-F' (BM327) "PeterJohn1" (named after his new-born son).

The Mk LFIXe Spitfire, MK356, was built in March 1944 and fitted with a Merlin 66 engine with a two-speed, two-stage supercharger optimised for low altitudes. Allocated to the Royal Canadian Air Force 144 wing, based in various locations around southern England, she took part in the Rodeo fighter sweep over occupied France in the weeks leading up to D-Day. After the war she served as a gate guardian at Hawkinge and Locking, and was recovered and refurbished in 1992 for the BBMF. As of 2017, she is displayed in a desert paint scheme used by No. 92 Squadron in Tunisia in 1943.

There are also two PRXIX Spitfires, both built in 1945 with Griffon 66 engines. PM631 was too late to see operational services in World War II and carried out civilian duties with the Temperature and Humidity Monitoring Flight (THUM) at RAF Woodvale until 11 July 1957, when she became part of the Historic Aircraft Flight; she is the longest-serving aircraft in the BBMF and is currently painted to represent a 541 Squadron Spitfire.

PS915 performed various reconnaissance duties at RAF Wunstorf in Germany.  She returned to the UK in 1954 and was retired to gate guarding duties.  In 1987 she was modified with a Griffon 58 engine and refurbished to flying condition by British Aerospace.  She currently carries the markings of PS888 of 81 Squadron based at Seletar, Singapore, during the Malayan Emergency which conducted the last operational RAF Spitfire sortie on 1 April 1954, photographing communist guerrilla hideouts over an area of jungle in Johore.  The ground crew painted the inscription "The Last!" on PS 915's left engine cowling.

One Mark XIX Spitfire, PS853, was sold in 1994 to defray the costs of rebuilding Hurricane LF363 after her crash-landing on the runway at RAF Wittering due to engine failure in 1991. The BBMF pilot escaped with a broken ankle and minor bruises, whilst LF363 was engulfed and devastated by the resulting fire.

Spitfire Mark XVI TE311, built as a low-back with clipped wings and powered with a Packard Merlin engine, was acquired in 2002 and initially allocated for spares, but officially added to the BBMF collection in 2007. TE311 was made airworthy in the later stages of the 2012 display season. TE311 is currently painted as the personal aircraft of Gp Capt Aleksander Gabszewicz, the Officer Commanding No. 131 (Polish) Wing.

Hurricanes

There are two Hurricanes. LF363 is a Mk IIc and the last Hurricane to have entered service with the RAF. She appeared in the films Angels One Five, Reach for the Sky, The Battle of Britain, and a TV series The War in the Air. PZ865, is a Mk IIc built six months after LF363; she is the last Hurricane ever to have been built. She once wore the inscription "The last of the Many" on her port and starboard sides - the original fabric with this inscription is now located in the BBMF Headquarters at RAF Coningsby.

Lancaster

The Lancaster bomber - PA474, acquired by the BBMF in 1973, is one of only two surviving airworthy examples of the type; the other is in Canada. She was built in mid-1945 and assigned to reconnaissance duties after appearing too late to take part in the bombing of Japan. After various duties, she was adopted by the Air Historical Branch for display work. She appeared in two films: Operation Crossbow and The Guns of Navarone. Having been flown for much of her service with the BBMF as the "City of Lincoln", PA474 previously wore the markings of the "Phantom of the Ruhr", a Lancaster that flew 121 sorties (a so-called "ton-up" Lancaster). Originally assigned to 100 Squadron in June 1943, the original "Phantom" was transferred to 101 Squadron in November that year and finished the war as part of 550 Squadron at Ludford Magna. The Lancaster currently carries the markings of AR-L 'Leader', which served with No 460 Squadron (RAAF). 
PA474 displays the markings of bombs for operations over Germany, ice-cream cones for operations over Italy and poppies when she releases poppies during exhibition flights. During the 2008 RAF Waddington Air Day, PA474 was flown in formation with the recently restored Avro Vulcan XH558 in an historic display of two Avro "heavy metal" classics.

Dakota

The Dakota, ZA947, built at Long Beach, California in March 1942, was issued to the US Army Air Forces and later transferred to the Royal Canadian Air Force where she served until 1971. The aircraft was purchased by the Royal Aircraft Establishment before being issued to the BBMF in March 1993. She is equipped with authentic period 'para seats' and is used in commemorative parachute drops.

The Dakota did serve solely as a support aircraft for the flight and as a multi-engine tail-wheel trainer for the Lancaster; but recently she has also acted as a display aircraft in her own right. ZA947 is becoming increasingly popular with the public and 2013 saw the aircraft making many appearances.

Chipmunks

The two Chipmunks (WG486 and WK518), are the last in RAF service, but are not intended for display use; rather, they serve to give pilots experience in flying aircraft with a tailwheel landing gear, a design that has now vanished from the modern RAF fleet. Chipmunk WG486 flew reconnaissance missions over East Germany, as part of the RAF Gatow Station Flight, in co-operation with the British Commander-in-Chief's Mission to the Group of Soviet Forces in Germany, commonly known as BRIXMIS.

Flypasts

The flight also regularly takes part in combined flypasts with other recognisable British aircraft, such as the Red Arrows. It appeared on occasion with Concorde before that aircraft's withdrawal from service in October 2003.

For much of the 2014 display season the flight was joined by Canadian built Lancaster Mark X FM213. This aircraft is owned and operated by the Canadian Warplane Heritage Museum and made the 3,000-mile trip to the UK, via Goose Bay and Keflavik arriving at RAF Coningsby on 9 August. FM213 (C-GVRA) is dedicated to the memory of P/O Andrew Mynarski VC and is referred to as the "Mynarski Memorial Lancaster". It is painted in the colours of his aircraft KB726 – VR-A, which flew with RCAF No. 419 (Moose) Squadron, and is affectionately known as Vera. She displayed with PA474 in the first Lancaster two-aircraft formation for 50 years, with both Lancasters visiting a large number of air shows and events before Vera's departure back to Canada in mid-September.

History of the flight

Biggin Hill
In the years following World War II it became traditional for a Spitfire and Hurricane to lead the Victory Day flypast over London. From that event there grew the idea to form a historic collection of flyable aircraft, initially to commemorate the RAF's major battle honour, the Battle of Britain, and latterly with broadened scope, to commemorate the RAF's involvement in all the campaigns of World War II. Thus in 1957 the Historic Aircraft Flight was formed at RAF Biggin Hill with one Hurricane (LF363) and three Mk XIX Spitfires (PM631, PS853 and PS915), in what, even then, had become a predominantly jet-powered air force. 
There is evidence that at least one of the Spifires sometimes flew with a single Hawker Hunter F5 of 41 Sqn (the last operational squadron to operate from RAF Biggin Hill) which co-resided with the Spitfires and Hurricane at that time. The two aircraft together were referred to in an official Biggin Hill "At Home" Day Display programme as the 'Battle of Britain Flight'.

Coltishall
The Battle of Britain Memorial Flight arrived at RAF Coltishall in April 1963, it was then known as the Historic Flight. From April 1st 1969 it was officially known as the Battle of Britain flight, becoming the Battle of Britain Memorial flight when the Lancaster joined the flight in 1973, a name it still holds

The Flight moved from RAF Horsham St Faiths, now Norwich Airport in April 1963, three years after the first English Electric Lightnings arrived and would stay until expansion of the SEPECAT Jaguar on the station.  As the Jaguar force increased, and hangar space was needed, the flight moved to its current base RAF Coningsby.

It was at Coltishall that the flight became an established unit with dedicated manpower, previously it had been maintained by ad-hoc groundcrew of the relevant station flight.  It was at RAF Coltishall the BBMF was truly born and expanded from two to seven Historic aircraft and a training Chipmunk.

Coningsby
BBMF moved to its present home at RAF Coningsby in 1976, since then it has acquired several more aircraft including, the first Chipmunk acquired in 1983, a Dakota was originally acquired in 1995, as a more reliable multi-engine trainer than the de Havilland Devon, that was nicknamed the 'Devon State Two', due to its tendency to return to the ground on an emergency state two; but has since taken a fuller role in BBMFs line up. The Spitfires and Hurricanes in the flight have varied over the years, as new aircraft are acquired and older ones passed to museums or used for parts.

Past and current BBMF homes
Over the years the BBMF have called many RAF bases "home". These include: Biggin Hill July 1957–March 1958, North Weald March–May 1958, Martlesham Heath May 1958–November 1961, Horsham St Faith November 1961–April 1963, Coltishall April 1963–March 1976 and RAF Coningsby since March 1976.

Service history of the aircraft
Aircraft currently in the flight have served with the RAF, the United States Army Air Forces, and the Royal Canadian Air Force, as well as having been privately owned; whilst in the RAF, they were flown by Czechoslovakian, Polish, South African, American and Canadian pilots. Some were sold for scrapping and later saved, whilst at least one has been on operational service with the RAF for almost fifty years.

Visitor Centre
The Battle of Britain Memorial Flight Visitor Centre is located at RAF Coningsby in Coningsby, Lincolnshire. A partnership between the Royal Air Force and Lincolnshire County Council, the centre allows visitors an up-close guided tour of the aircraft when not in use, as well as exhibits about the aircraft and other temporary exhibits.

See also
 Royal Navy Historic Flight
 Canadian Warplane Heritage Museum
 Commemorative Air Force, in Midland, Texas
 Shuttleworth Collection at Old Warden near Biggleswade in Bedfordshire, England
 Fantasy of Flight, in Polk City, Florida
 Champlin Fighter Collection at the Seattle Museum of Flight
 The Lone Star Flight Museum in Galveston, Texas
 The Yankee Air Museum in Ypsilanti, Michigan
 The Historic Aircraft Restoration Museum in St Louis, Missouri

References

External links

 The Battle Of Britain Memorial Flight homepage
 The Battle Of Britain Memorial Flight's official club

News items
 At BBC Lincolnshire in 2009
 Meeting Poland's Foreign Minister in June 2008
 Lancaster re-fit in April 2007
 Flypast in April 2002

Video clips
 Overall history of the Spitfire with an appraisal of the aircraft by Sqn Ldr Paul Day (former BBMF Commanding Officer) at Coningsby
 At Biggin Hill in August 2007
 At Duxford in May 2007

Royal Air Force independent flights
Britain Memorial Flight
Military units and formations established in 1957
Organisations based in Lincolnshire
Museums in Lincolnshire
Military aviation museums in England
Aircraft preservation